Jefferson Park Glacier is located in the U.S. state of Oregon. The glacier is situated in the Cascade Range on the northwest slopes of Mount Jefferson.

See also
 List of glaciers in the United States

References

Glaciers of Mount Jefferson
Glaciers of Linn County, Oregon
Glaciers of Marion County, Oregon
Glaciers of Oregon